If I Were Free is a 1933 American pre-Code drama film directed by Elliott Nugent and written by Dwight Taylor, based on the play, Behold, We Live by John Van Druten. The film stars Irene Dunne, Clive Brook, Nils Asther and Henry Stephenson. The film was released on December 1, 1933, by RKO Pictures.

Plot
A suicidal World War I veteran and an antique dealer, both of whom are married to different people, embark on a love affair.

Cast
Irene Dunne as Sarah Cazenove
Clive Brook as Gordon Evers
Nils Asther as Tono Casanove
Henry Stephenson as Hector Stribling
Vivian Tobin as Jewel Stribling
Laura Hope Crews as Dame Evers
Tempe Pigott as Mrs. Gill

References

External links
 

1933 films
American black-and-white films
RKO Pictures films
Films directed by Elliott Nugent
1933 drama films
American drama films
Adultery in films
Films set in Paris
1930s English-language films
1930s American films